Great Mosque of Amadiya is a historic mosque in the town of Amadiya, Iraqi Kurdistan. It was first founded in 1177 during the Abbasid era, and has been renovated several times throughout its history.

Description
The minaret contains spiral staircase which reaches to the top. It is often compared with the minaret of the Great Mosque of al-Nuri in Mosul, which resembles in the construction date and certain characteristics such as square shaped foundation and cylindrical structure. During the 18th century, the dome of the minaret was damaged during a raid, and it was renovated subsequently after. In 1961, the mosque was hit by Iraqi government airstrikes which damaged the upper section of the minaret. It was later reconstructed using the original stones.

The mosque contains harem and several domes built of plasters, mud and stones. The harem is divided into two sections; an upper section built by the Sultan Hussein, and the lower section which is a prayer room for women.

The mosque has a historic madrasa which once used to be the biggest educational institution in the town. The madrasa used to teach religious related materials, including Fiqh and the Arabic language. It was refurbished by the Sultan Hussein. It has a mosque in the south with an arches and dome, and library which stores works related to Fiqh.

See also

 Islam in Iraq
 List of mosques in Iraq

References

12th-century mosques
Abbasid architecture

Mosques in Iraq
Amadiya